Guido Pella was the defending champion but chose not to participate.

Gonzalo Lama won the title, defeating Ernesto Escobedo 6–2, 6–2 in the final.

Seeds

Draw

Finals

Top half

Bottom half

References
Main Draw
Qualifying Draw

Sao Paulo Challenger de Tenis - Singles